Brenda Remilton-Ward (born 24 February 1956) is an Australian former professional tennis player. She competed as Brenda Remilton, then Brenda Remilton-Ward after marriage.

Biography
Remilton-Ward competed on the professional tour in the 1980s and featured in the main draw of all four grand slam tournaments during her career. She reached the third round of the 1981 French Open, registering wins over Heidi Eisterlehner and Anne Hobbs.

As a doubles player, she won one WTA Tour title, which came at Japan's Borden Classic tournament in 1982, partnering Naoko Sato. Remilton-Ward and Sato were also women's doubles quarter-finalists at the 1984 French Open, eliminated by top seeds Martina Navratilova and Pam Shriver.

WTA Tour finals

Doubles (1–4)

References

External links
 
 

1956 births
Living people
Australian female tennis players